Sparganothis chambersana is a species of moth of the family Tortricidae. It is found in the United States, including Arkansas, Florida, Kentucky, Louisiana, Maryland, Mississippi, Missouri, New York, North Carolina, Ohio, South Carolina, Tennessee and Texas.

The wingspan is about 16–20 mm.

References

Moths described in 1907
Sparganothis